This article outlines Somali names.

Tradition

Although it is normal among Somalis to call one another by their given name, in more formal situations, honorific terms may be used as well, such as adeer to males senior to oneself, or sheekh to a religious figure, or mudane, an individual one holds in high regard. There are also terms of endearment which are used, such as huunno (gender-neutral), other gender-neutral terms of address for one's peers, such as jaalle, saaxib, eebbow, eeddo, or abboowe. There are also terms of address for significant others, such as gacalo and terms of address for younger people, i.e. maandhow (lab / masculine), maandhey (dheddig / feminine), or igaarkey (lab / masculine) and igaartey (dheddig / feminine).

The patronymic format wherein one does not have a surname, for example with Axmed Yusuf Qaasim, would be a person whose given name is "Axmed", whose father's proper name was "Yusuf" and whose grandfather's name was "Qaasim".

List of Somali names

Masculine

Aabbediid 
Abroone
Abshir
Abtidoon
Adooneebe
Afgab
Allaalle
Almis
Amare
Amaanle
Araarsame
Awsame
Ayaanle
Ayaxoow
Aye
Aroow
Baashe
Bacalwaan
Badhiidh
Bahdoon
Barkhad
Barre 
Barsame
Baxnaan
Beyle
Biixi 
Bile 
Bisinle
Bisle
Boorle
Bootaan 
Boqorre  
Bulxan 
Buraale
Batax
Buux
Babow
Baraxow
Caateye
Cabbane
Cabsiiye
Caddaawe
Cadoosh
Caaggane
Calas
Calasoow
Careys
Carre
Cartan 
Carraale
Casoowe
Catoosh
Casood 
Cawaale
Cawad 
Caweys
Cawke
Cawil 
Cawl
Caydiid
Caynaan
Caynaanshe
Celeeye
Cige 
Cigaal
Cigalle
Ciidaways 
Ciiltire
Ciise
Cilmi
Cokiye
Colaad
Coldiid
Coldoon
Colow
Cosoble
Daaliy
Dalal
Dalmaraways  
Damal
Dawaale
Deeq
Deheeye
Dhakak
Dharaar
Dhabar
Dhamac
Dheeg
Dhiblaawe 
Dhinbiil
Dhooddi
Dhuule
Dhuux
Dhuxul
Dicin
Didar
Digaale
Diirrane
Diiriye
Dillaal 
Dirir
Dubbad
Dubbe
Ducaale
Duddub
Dugsiiye
Erasto 
Faahiye
Faarax
Food
Foosi
Fure
fayla-aroow
Gaafane
Gaarane
Gabeyre 
Gaboose
Gaboobe
Gabyow
Gacayte 
Gadiid 
Gafle
Galaal 
Galab
Galayax 
Galbeyte 
Gallad
Gamadiid
Gamiye
Garaad
Garre
Geeddi 
Geeddow
Geeldoon
Geelle
Geeljire
Geesaale
Geesi
Gobdoon
Godane
Good 
Guhaad 
Garaase
Gurey
Gurmad
Gurxan
Guuldoon
Guuleed 
Guutaale
Guure 
Habbane
Halas
Hanad 
Haybe 
Harti
Hiirane
Hirad
Hiraab
Hidan
Hufane 
Hurre 
Huruuse
Iftin
Iidle
Ilays
Irbad
Jaajuumow
Jaamac
Jabane
Jaalle
Jannagale
Jayte
Jiilaal
Jimcaale
Jowhar
Jaahurow
kofarey
Kaahin
Kaahiye
Kaariye
Kaarshe
Kediye 
Kamas
Karbaashe
Kartiile
Kawaaliye
Kayd 
Keenadiid
Keynaan
Keyse
Khayre
Kiile
Koombe
Kooshin 
Koosafaare
Kuluc
Kunciil 
Lediye
Liban
Liibaan
Lo'odoon
Looyaan 
Maax
Maawel
Madar 
Madoobe
Magan 
Mahad 
Malow
Mataan 
Maxabe
Maydhane
Maygaag
Mayow
Migil
Miicaad
Miiggane 
Mire 
Mooge 
Mudcin
Naalleeye 
Nabaddoon
Nageeye 
Nasiiye
Naardiid
Obsiiye 
Odawaa 
Oogle 
Qaar
Qawrax 
Qamaan 
Qabille
Qalinle
Qaloon
Qarshe
Qorane
Qarshiile
Qayaad
Qaybdiid 
Raage
Rays
Riyaale
Rooble
Rirashe
Sade
Sahal
Sakariye
Samaale 
Samaane
Samadoon
Samagale
Samakaab 
Samatalis
Samatar 
Samawade
Saxardiid
Sharmaarke 
Sharmooge
Shidane
Shide
Shirdoon
Shire 
Shirshore
Shirwac
Siyaad
Sooyaan
Suban
Suubbane
Sugaal
Suge
Sugulle
Suudi 
Tabale
Tadalesh
Talasame
Tanade
Taraar
Tubeec
Tukaale
Tosane 
Ubaxle
Ugaas
Waabberi
Waaheen 
Waare
Waaruf
Waasuge 
Wacays
Waraabe
Wardheere 
Warfaa
Warmooge 
Warsame 
Warqayrle
Weheliye
Xaad
Xaashi
Xaayow
Xabbad
Xalane 
Xandulle
Xarbi
Xareed
Xawaadle
Xayd
Xildiid
Xiirey
Xirsi
Xoosh
Xujaale
Yaabe
yabaal
Yabare
Yalaxoow
Yoonis

Feminine

Absan
Almas
Aragsan
Asli
Astur
Ayaan
Axado
Baarlin
Bacado
Barkhado
Barni
Barwaaqo
Basra
Batuulo
Baxsan
Beydan
Bilan
Biliiso
Bishaaro
Bullo
Buuxo
Cajabo
Calaso
Canbaro
Carro
Cawo
Cawrala
Ceebla
Cosob
Cudbi
Culus
Cutiya
Deggane
Dalays
Deeqa
Degmo
Dhibla
Dhudhi
Ebyan
Faduun
Fadumo
Falis
Filsan
Faroow
Fatuma
Gaasira
Gallado
Gargaaro
Haboon
Hadliya
Halgan
Haweeya
Hibaaq
Hira
Hodan
Hodman
Hoodo
Idil
Idman
Iftin
Iglan
Ilhaan
Ilwaad
Ilays
Isniino
Jamaad
Jarmaad
Jiijo
Jimco
Kaaha
Kaafiya
Kiin
Koos. 
Kulane
Ladan
Laqanyo
Libin
Liin
Lula
Maane
Maandeeq
Magool
Mahado
Malabo
Malyuun
Marwo
Maryan
Melaaneey
Milgo
Mudan
Mullaaxo
Mulki
Muxubbo
Nagaad
Naruuro
Nashaad
Nasteexo
Nurto
Najax
Nahlaa
Nakhaa 
Naju  
Nayruus
Qalanjo
Qaayaweyn
Qumman
Ralliya
Roda
Ruun
Sada
Saado
Sabaad
Sagal
Saluugla
Saredo
Saxarla
Shacni
Shaqlan
Shuun
Shankaroon
Siman
Siraad
Sohane
Suubban
Taliso
Tawllan
Timiro
Tisa
Toolmoon
Toosan
Tusmo
Ubax
Ugaaso
Ugbaad
Yurub
Waris
Warsan
Wiilo
Xaadsan
Xaali
Xabado
Xaddiyo
Xalan
Xareedo
Xiddig

References

Somali culture
Names by culture